These are the Billboard magazine R&B singles chart number one hits of 1993:

Chart history

See also
1993 in music
List of number-one R&B hits (United States)
List of number-one R&B albums of 1993 (U.S.)

References

1993
1993 record charts
1993 in American music